The girls' singles tournament of the 2020 European Junior Badminton Championships was held from 2 to 7 November. Line Christophersen from Denmark clinched this title in the last edition.

Seeds
Seeds were announced on 16 October.

 Anastasiia Shapovalova (champions)
 Amy Tan (quarterfinals)
 Ania Setien (second round)
 Marija Sudimac (semifinals)
 Katharina Fink (second round)
 Mariia Golubeva (quarterfinals)
 Yasmine Hamza (second round)
 Lucia Rodriguez (quarterfinals)

Draw

Finals

Top half

Section 1

Section 2

Bottom half

Section 3

Section 4

References

External links 
Main Draw

2020 European Junior Badminton Championships